The 2017–18 Sam Houston State Bearkats men's basketball team represented Sam Houston State University during the 2017–18 NCAA Division I men's basketball season. The Bearkats, led by eighth-year head coach Jason Hooten, played their home games at the Bernard Johnson Coliseum in Huntsville, Texas as members of the Southland Conference. They finished the season 21–15, 12–6 in Southland play to finish in fourth place. They defeated New Orleans in the quarterfinals of the Southland tournament before losing in the semifinals to Southeastern Louisiana. They were invited to the CollegeInsider.com Tournament where, after a first round bye, they defeated Eastern Michigan in the second round and UTSA in the quarterfinals before losing in the semifinals to Northern Colorado.

Previous season
The Bearkats finished the 2016–17 season 1–13, 10–8 in Southland play to finish in a tie for fifth place. They defeated Central Arkansas and Houston Baptist to advance to the semifinals of the Southland tournament where they lost to New Orleans. Despite having 21 wins, they did not participate in a postseason tournament.

Roster

Schedule and results

|-
!colspan=9 style="background:#; color:#;"| Non-conference regular season

|-
!colspan=9 style="background:#; color:#;"| Southland regular season

|-
!colspan=9 style="background:#;"| Southland tournament

|-
!colspan=9 style="background:#;"|CIT

See also
2017–18 Sam Houston State Bearkats women's basketball team

References

Sam Houston Bearkats men's basketball seasons
Sam Houston State
Sam Houston State Bearkats basketball
Sam Houston State Bearkats basketball
Sam Houston State Bearkats